Warsaw is a city in and the county seat of Kosciusko County, Indiana, United States.  Warsaw has a population of 15,804 as of the 2020 U.S. Census. Warsaw also borders a smaller town, Winona Lake.

Etymology
Warsaw, named after the capital of Poland in tribute to Tadeusz Kościuszko, was platted on October 21, 1836. Warsaw's post office was established in 1837.

History
Early Warsaw saw traders, trappers, and merchants supplying manufactured goods to area farmers. Because of the central location in the lake region, tourists soon began visiting Warsaw and eventually made permanent residences in the city, with industry soon following.

In March 1854, Warsaw became a town, and the initial census on February 2, 1854, showed a total of 752 residents in the town limits. The Pennsylvania Railroad (then known as the Pittsburgh, Fort Wayne, and Chicago Railroad) reached Warsaw in November 1854. The Big Four Railroad (Cleveland, Cincinnati, Chicago, and St Louis) arrived in Warsaw in August 1870.

Gas lights were installed in August 1880. Telephone lines were strung in 1882, with Dr. Eggleston having the first phone. The waterworks were constructed in 1885. Gas was supplemented with electricity in 1897, but gas was still used in many homes until 1915.

In 1895, Revra DePuy founded DePuy Manufacturing in Warsaw to make wire mesh and wooden splints, becoming the world's first manufacturer of orthopedic appliances. In 1905, DePuy hired Justin Zimmer as a splint salesman. Zimmer broke away from DePuy in 1927 to start his own orthopedic company with Joe Ettinger in the basement of Ettinger. Warsaw is now known as the "orthopaedic capital of the world."

The Warsaw-based East Fort Wayne Street Historic District, Kosciusko County Jail, Warsaw Courthouse Square Historic District, Warsaw Cut Glass Company, and Justin Zimmer House are listed on the National Register of Historic Places.

Geography
Warsaw is located at  (41.240564, -85.847002) and occupies the area between Pike Lake, Hidden Lake and Center Lake (to the north) and Winona Lake (to the southeast). The Tippecanoe River passes through the West portion of Warsaw. U.S. Route 30 and Indiana State Road 15 both pass through town, while Indiana State Road 25 begins on West Market Street while traffic is routed to West Winona Avenue along with State Road 15 after US Route 30 bypassed the downtown area.

Transportation

Airport
KASW - Warsaw Municipal Airport

Demographics

2010 census
As of the 2010 U.S. Census, there were 13,559 people, 5,461 households, and 3,311 families living in the city. The racial makeup of the city was 89.5% White, 1.6% African American, 0.5% Native American, 2.2% Asian, 4.3% from other races, and 2.0% from two or more races. Hispanic or Latino of any race were 10.4% of the population.

There were 5,461 households, of which 32.1% had children under the age of 18 living with them, 43.1% were married couples living together, 12.8% had a female householder with no husband present, 4.7% had a male householder with no wife present, and 39.4% were non-families. 32.8% of all households were made up of individuals, and 11.7% had someone living alone who was 65 years of age or older. The average household size was 2.38 and the average family size was 3.02.

The median age in the city was 34.8 years. 25.2% of residents were under the age of 18; 9.2% were between the ages of 18 and 24; 28.2% were from 25 to 44; 24% were from 45 to 64; and 13.4% were 65 years of age or older. The gender makeup of the city was 49.1% male and 50.9% female.

2000 census
As of the 2000 U.S. Census, there were 12,415 people, 4,794 households, and 3,068 families living in the city. The racial makeup of the city was 70.50% White, 1.41% African American, 0.39% Native American, 1.07% Asian, 0.02% Pacific Islander, 5.25% from other races, and 1.37% from two or more races. Hispanic or Latino of any race were 29.21% of the population.

There were 4,794 households, out of which 32.4% had children under the age of 18 living with them, 49.0% were married couples living together, 10.8% had a female householder with no husband present, and 36.0% were non-families. 30.4% of all households were made up of individuals, and 11.8% had someone living alone who was 65 years of age or older. The average household size was 2.49 and the average family size was 3.11.

In the city, the population was spread out, with 26.0% under the age of 18, 10.9% from 18 to 24, 29.0% from 25 to 44, 21.0% from 45 to 64, and 13.2% who were 65 years of age or older. The median age was 34 years. For every 100 females, there were 97.3 males. For every 100 females age 18 and over, there were 93.3 males.

The median income for a household in the city was $36,564, and the median income for a family was $45,153. Males had a median income of $33,322 versus $22,284 for females. The per capita income for the city was $19,262. About 6.8% of families and 9.2% of the population were below the poverty line, including 8.7% of those under age 18 and 13.4% of those age 65 or over.

Government

Warsaw has an elected mayor, clerk and city council-style of government. Officials are elected for four-year terms. Warsaw's current mayor is Republican Dr. Joseph Thallemer, who has served since January 1, 2012. Mike Hodges is Warsaw's longest-serving mayor who served for 5 terms.

Representatives - common council
The Warsaw Common Council is a seven-member legislative group that serve four-year terms. Five of the members represent specific districts; two are elected citywide as at-large council members.

Jack Wilhite: At-large
Cindy Dobbins: At-large
Jeff Grose: 1st district
Ron Shoemaker: 2nd district
Mike Klondaris: 3rd district 
William "Jerry" Frush: 4th district
Diane Quance: 5th district 
Lynne Christiansen: Clerk-Treasurer

Economy

Warsaw, known as the "Orthopedic Capital of the World", is home to the first orthopedic device manufacturer, the DePuy Manufacturing Company, started in 1895 by Revra DePuy. Competitors, such as Zimmer, Inc. in 1927 and Biomet, Inc. in 1977, have subsequently been founded in Warsaw to support the industry. Several orthopedic suppliers are also present.

Other companies headquartered in Warsaw are Da-Lite, makers of commercial and home theater projection screens; LSC Communications, a commercial printing press; Dalton Foundry, a malleable iron casting foundry; ABC Industries, a leader in mining ventilation products and industrial textile fabrics; Penguin Point, a regional fast-food chain; and PayLeap, a payment gateway service provider. Historically, Warsaw was home to the Biltwell Basket Company and to Explorer Van, founded by Bob Kesler.

Culture

Warsaw is home to the Wagon Wheel Theatre founded in 1956 and becoming a non-profit organization in 2011 featuring a "theatre in the round".

Movies shot in Warsaw include American Teen by Nanette Burstein which premiered at Sundance Film Festival, New Life (film), produced by Erin Bethea, Long Gone By and Room 441.

City Parks, the Lake City Greenway Trails, City County Athletic Complex (CCAC) and two golf courses offer citizens recreation. Central Park, which overlooks Center Lake, is host to regular concerts during the summer months.

Center Lake Park includes the Warsaw Biblical Gardens which is a noted Biblical garden.

The Rotary Club of Warsaw was chartered on June 1, 1919, being one of the oldest clubs in the community and part of Rotary International.
residence.

Radio 
WRSW-FM, Classic Hits 107.3 is the 50,000-watt heritage station of the Warsaw community for over 70 years
"Willie 103.5" WAWC is Warsaw's Fun Country Station began broadcasting in Warsaw in November 2006
News Now Warsaw 1480 AM and 99.7 FM (WRSW-AM provides National and Local News and Information around the clock 
WLAB, Star 88.3, broadcasts to the community, via its translator on FM radio frequency 90.9 FM
Oldies 101.1, (WLQZ-LP), where they are "Always Playing a Better Oldie."

Education
 Alternative Learning Center, public school · grades 9-12 · 680 students
 Charter College of Health and Massage Therapy
 Certified Natural Health Professionals · Natural Health Education and Certification
 Edgewood Middle School, public school · grades 7-8 · 887 students
 Eisenhower Elementary School, public school · grades K-6 · 523 students
 Grace College - Warsaw Campus
 Harrison Elementary School, public school. grades K-6. 611 students
 Indiana Tech - Warsaw Campus
 Ivy Tech Community College - North Central Campus
 Lakeland Christian Academy, private school · grades Pre K-12 
 Lakeview Middle School, public school · grades 7-8 · 760 students
 Lighthouse Christian Academy, private school · grades Pre K-12 454 students
 Lincoln Elementary School, public school · grades K-6 · 456 students
 Living Stone's Preparatory School, private school · grades Pre K-12
 Madison Elementary School, public school · grades K-6 · 563 students
 Monarch Christian Academy, private School · grades K-12 · 23 students
 Sacred Heart School, private school · grades Pre K-6 · 206 students
 Trinity School of Natural Health · Distance Learning Natural Health Education
 Warsaw Community High School, public school · grades 9-12 · 1,947 students
 Washington STEM Academy, public school · grades K-6 · 555 students

The city has a lending library, the Warsaw Community Public Library.

Notable people

 Whitey Bell, NBA, ABL player (1959-1963)
 Ambrose Bierce, author of The Devil's Dictionary
 Jack E. Bowers. Illinois state legislator and lawyer
 Howard Brubaker, magazine editor and writer
 Shea Couleé, drag queen
 Jesse E. Eschbach, jurist
 David C. Fisher, author, pastor
 Rick Fox, actor and former NBA basketball player
 Randy Heisler, Olympic athlete
 Ben Higgins, former Bachelor and Bachlorette contestant
Scottie James (born 1996), basketball player for Hapoel Haifa in the Israeli Basketball Premier League
 Gary Kosins, NFL player
 Hal Kratzsch, an original member of famed singing group The Four Freshmen
 James R. Leininger, physician, founder of Kinetic Concepts
 Tom Metzger, former Grand Wizard of the Ku Klux Klan
 Nic Moore, professional basketball player
 Marshall Plumlee, professional basketball player
 Mason Plumlee, professional basketball player
 Miles Plumlee, professional basketball player
 Jill Long Thompson, former U.S. congresswoman from Indiana
 Todd Alan Clem (a.k.a. "Bubba The Love Sponge"), radio personality/shock jock
 Steve Hollar, actor
 Max Truex, Olympic athlete

References

External links
 
 Official Kosciusko County Visitors Bureau
 
 

Cities in Indiana
Cities in Kosciusko County, Indiana
Micropolitan areas of Indiana
County seats in Indiana